Rzesznikówko  is a settlement in the administrative district of Gmina Rymań, within Kołobrzeg County, West Pomeranian Voivodeship, in north-western Poland.

This residential area was first created in the mid-19th century when farms were being laid out northwest of the village of Reselkow. For the history of the region, see History of Pomerania.

References

Villages in Kołobrzeg County